The 2002 Tirreno–Adriatico was the 37th edition of the Tirreno–Adriatico cycle race and was held from 14 March to 20 March 2002. The race started in Massa Lubrense and finished in San Benedetto del Tronto. The race was won by Erik Dekker of the Rabobank team.

General classification

References

2002
2002 in Italian sport